Catocala florianii is a moth in the family Erebidae. It is found in China (Shaanxi).

References

florianii
Moths described in 2008
Moths of Asia